Alfred Duff Cooper, 1st Viscount Norwich,  (22 February 1890 – 1 January 1954), known as Duff Cooper, was a British Conservative Party politician and diplomat who was also a military and political historian.

First elected to Parliament in 1924, he lost his seat in 1929 but returned to Parliament in the 1931 Westminster St George's by-election, which was seen as a referendum on Stanley Baldwin's leadership of the Conservative Party. He later served in the Cabinet as Secretary of State for War and First Lord of the Admiralty. In the intense political debates of the late 1930s over appeasement, he first put his trust in the League of Nations, and later realised that war with Germany was inevitable. He denounced the Munich agreement of 1938 as meaningless, cowardly, and unworkable, as he resigned from the cabinet.

When Winston Churchill became prime minister in May 1940, he named Cooper as Minister of Information. From 1941, he served in numerous diplomatic roles. He also served an important role as representative to Charles de Gaulle's Free France (1943–44) and ambassador to France from 1944 to 1948.

Background and education
Duff Cooper (he was always known as "Duff" rather than "Alfred") was born at Cavendish Square. He was the only son of society doctor Sir Alfred Cooper (1843–1908), a surgeon who specialised in the sexual problems of the upper classes (his carriage was humorously known as "Cooper's Clap Trap")  and Lady Agnes Duff, daughter of James Duff, 5th Earl Fife and  descendant of King William IV. She had already eloped with two husbands, the first of whom she deserted and the second of whom died, before marrying Cooper in 1882. Duff Cooper had three older sisters and one older half sister from his mother's first marriage. He attended two prep schools, including Wixenford. He was unhappy at prep school, but was then very happy at Eton College.

Oxford and early career
At New College Oxford (1908–11), Cooper's Eton friendship with John Neville Manners won him entry into a circle of young aristocrats and intellectuals known as "The Coterie", including Patrick Shaw-Stewart, Raymond Asquith, Sir Denis Anson, Edward Horner and Lady Diana Manners. Cooper cultivated a reputation for eloquence and fast living and, although he had established a reputation as a poet, he earned an even stronger reputation for gambling, womanising, and drinking in his studied emulation of the life of the 18th and 19th century Whig statesman Charles James Fox. Cooper's memory and gift for writing enabled him to do reasonably well at exams. He obtained a second in Modern History.

Following Oxford, Cooper entered the Foreign Service in October 1913, at the third attempt. During the war he worked in the commercial and the contraband departments. Owing to the national importance of his work at the cipher desk, he was exempted from military service until June 1917, when he joined the Grenadier Guards. He had not actively sought to join the Army but was happy to be "released" as a result of the manpower shortage, as he thought joining the Army the decent thing to do. To his surprise, most of his fellow officer cadets were working class and lower-middle-class men, almost all of whom had already served in the ranks.

Cooper spent six months on the Western Front, during which, Philip Ziegler writes, he proved himself "exceptionally courageous, resourceful, and a natural leader of men," at a time when the life expectancy of junior officers was very brief. He suffered a minor wound in the advance to the Albert Canal in August 1918, and was awarded the Distinguished Service Order (DSO) for conspicuous gallantry, a rare decoration for a junior officer. Almost all his closest friends, including Shaw-Stewart, Horner and Asquith were killed in the war, allowing him to draw closer to Lady Diana Manners, a socialite who was known for her eccentricities.

Post-war and marriage
After demobilisation, he returned to the Egypt Department, and was then Private Secretary to the Parliamentary Under-Secretary (i.e., assistant to the junior minister). He needed money to enter politics. He played significant roles in the Egyptian and Turkish crises in the early 1920s.

On 2 June 1919, he married Lady Diana Manners, whose family were initially opposed to the match. Diana's mother in particular thought Cooper a promiscuous drinker and gambler who was without title, position or wealth. Diana was officially the daughter of the 8th Duke of Rutland, but was widely believed – by herself included – to be the natural daughter of Harry Cust, a Belvoir Castle neighbour, and MP. In 1923, Lady Diana played the Madonna in the Max Reinhardt play “The Miracle". The money which she earned enabled Cooper to resign from the Foreign Office in July 1924.

Lady Diana tolerated Cooper's numerous affairs. These included the Franco-American Singer sewing-machine heiress Daisy Fellowes, the socialite Gloria Guinness, the French novelist Louise Leveque de Vilmorin and the writer Susan Mary Alsop (then an American diplomat's wife, by whom he had an illegitimate son, William Patten Jr, who later fathered W. Samuel Patten). The polo player 'Boy' Capel's wife Diana and the Anglo-Irish socialite and fashion model Maxime de la Falaise were two more, although Lady Diana reportedly did not mind and loved him nonetheless, explaining to their son: "They were the flowers, but I was the tree".

Political career, 1924–1939

1924–1931: In and out of Parliament
Within weeks Cooper was selected for the winnable seat of Oldham, where he was elected at the general election in October 1924, with a 13,000 majority over the sitting Labour member. He made a very successful maiden speech on Egypt, which was praised by H. A. L. Fisher who spoke next. The speech was also praised by several newspaper accounts. He was seen as a coming man within the party.  Cooper was a stalwart supporter of Prime Minister Stanley Baldwin, and a friend of Chancellor of the Exchequer, Winston Churchill. In January 1928 he was appointed Financial Secretary to the War Office, not a job he would have chosen. The Secretary of State Sir Laming Worthington-Evans gave him a lot of responsibility. He very likely would have been promoted if the Conservatives had won the election in 1929, but they were defeated and Cooper lost his own seat.

John Julius, his only legitimate child, was born in 1929. Out of Parliament, Cooper wrote a biography of the French statesman Talleyrand. He wrote slowly but seldom needed to revise his drafts. Philip Ziegler writes that "rarely can subject and author have been more satisfactorily matched" as both men were worldly and disliked cant. The book was eventually published in 1932 by his nephew Rupert Hart-Davis to critical praise and lasting success.

1931–1935: By-election and junior minister
The March 1931 by-election for the constituency of Westminster St George's (caused by the death of Cooper's recent boss, Laming Worthington-Evans), saw Beaverbrook's Empire Free Trade Crusade party threatening the Conservative position at a time when satisfaction with Baldwin's leadership was at a low. When the original Conservative candidate stepped down, Duff Cooper agreed to contest the election in what was regarded as a referendum on Baldwin's leadership. He won the seat with a majority of 5,710, thus returning to Parliament and serving until 1945.

In August 1931, on the formation of the National Government, he was appointed Financial Secretary to the War Office under the elderly Lord Crewe, who left Cooper to do a great deal of the work. In June 1934 he was appointed Financial Secretary to the Treasury, a traditional stepping stone to the Cabinet. This brought him close to the Chancellor of the Exchequer Neville Chamberlain, who thought highly of him. He had been to Germany, and had seen and been appalled by a Nuremberg Rally. Chamberlain told him to tone down his criticisms of Hitler. Cooper urged rearmament, not then a fashionable view, and briefed Churchill, then on the backbenches, that Hitler was serious and wanted war.

Cooper wrote the official biography of Field Marshal Haig, which appeared in 1935 and 1936. It was criticised for pro-Haig bias and what Ziegler calls "lack of consideration".

1935–1938: Cabinet and resignation

In November 1935, after the general election, Cooper was promoted to the Cabinet as Secretary of State for War and appointed to the Privy Council. During the Abdication Crisis he was sympathetic to Edward VIII and to the possibility of a morganatic marriage, and in vain advised him to wait until after his coronation (due in 1937) before picking a fight with the government over his plans to marry Wallis Simpson.

He felt out of kilter with the Conservative leadership and was surprised when the new Prime Minister Neville Chamberlain appointed him First Lord of the Admiralty in May 1937. Philip Ziegler writes that his tenure of office was "an unequivocal success". He enjoyed high living on board the Admiralty yacht HMS Enchantress, but fought Chamberlain and the Chancellor of the Exchequer Sir John Simon for more spending on the Royal Navy. Chamberlain saw him as indiscreet and as a firebrand. By the time of the Munich Agreement, Cooper was isolated in the Cabinet as the most public critic of Chamberlain's appeasement policy.

On 3 October 1938, a few days after the Munich Agreement, he denounced it and resigned from the Cabinet. On doing so he said, "War with honour or peace with dishonour," he might have been persuaded to accept, "but war with dishonour – that was too much". Fellow appeasement-critic and Conservative Party MP Vyvyan Adams described Cooper's actions as "the first step in the road back to national sanity".

As a backbencher, he joined the coterie around Anthony Eden (who had resigned as Foreign Secretary in February 1938), but made only muted criticisms of the Government. His main source of income was writing articles for the Evening Standard. He argued for an Anglo-French alliance.

Second World War
By now German propaganda ranked Cooper with Churchill and Eden as Britain's most dangerous Conservative warmongers. Unlike the other two, Cooper was not offered a job on the outbreak of war in September 1939. He went on a lecture tour of the US, where he called for the democracies to stand firm against the dictatorships, and predicted that Churchill would become Prime Minister, which seemed an eccentric prediction at the time.

From May 1940 he was Minister of Information under Churchill, but disliked the job. His son John Julius said that his father was "out of sympathy" with the job from the beginning because he was opposed to censorship. The press, led by the newspaper magnate Lord Beaverbrook and his Daily Express, portrayed Cooper as a spin doctor and as an enemy of a free press. His inquirers into the state of public morale were known as "Cooper's snoopers". He authorised a strong denunciation of the author P. G. Wodehouse for making an ill-advised humorous broadcast from Berlin. He and Lady Diana sent their eleven-year-old son John Julius to the US in 1940, as they feared that Cooper being on Hitler's blacklist might lead to their son being killed or taken as a hostage in the event of a German invasion. Many of Cooper's friends and colleagues took a dim view of this, and it earned Cooper further criticism in the press and some hostile questioning from MPs in Parliament. John Julius returned two years later.

In July 1941 he was appointed Chancellor of the Duchy of Lancaster, to his relief. He was sent to Singapore as Minister Resident, charged with reporting on the situation in the Far East and the state of British defences. He had the authority to form a War Cabinet there, but both military and civil authorities were reluctant to cooperate with him. To his relief Archibald Wavell was appointed Supreme Commander ABDA. He was – unfairly in Philip Ziegler's view – blamed for the Fall of Singapore after his return to the UK. Eighteen months of underemployment followed. He chaired the Cabinet Committee on Security. He did a lot of writing and spent his weekends at Bognor where his wife had a smallholding.

Ambassador to France
In December 1943 Cooper was appointed British Representative on the Free French French Committee of National Liberation. His remit included maintaining a working relationship between Churchill and de Gaulle, two men whom he found equally difficult. Paris was liberated in August 1944 and he moved there in September. On 18 November 1944 he formally presented his credentials as British Ambassador to France He was to prove a very popular ambassador, with Lady Diana helping to make his term of office a great social success. Some contemporary eyebrows were raised at his willingness to entertain people with dubious records during the recent war, or his lack of interest at entertaining trade unionists. In the words of the British historian P. M. H. Bell, Cooper was such a "devoted Francophile" that during his time as ambassador to Paris he often tried the patience of the Foreign Office by going well beyond his instructions to maintain good relations with France by trying to create an Anglo-French alliance that would dominate post-war Europe.

Despite being a Conservative, Cooper was not replaced as Ambassador when Labour won the 1945 election as Ernest Bevin, the new Foreign Secretary, valued an ambassador who was close friends with so many French politicians and even managed to have a friendship of sorts with Charles de Gaulle. In January 1947, Cooper, acting without orders, began the process that led to the Treaty of Dunkirk when he suggested to the French Premier Leon Blum that there should an Anglo-French military alliance, an idea Blum took up thinking this was an offer from London. The Treaty, which fulfilled his long-held desire for an Anglo-French alliance, was signed on 4 March 1947.

Cooper's term as ambassador ended at the end of 1947. He bequeathed a large part of his library to the British Embassy in Paris. To the dismay of his successor he remained in Paris, living at the Château Saint-Firmin in the Park of Chantilly.

Retirement
Cooper was raised to the Order of St Michael and St George (GCMG) in 1948. He took on some company directorships, including that of the Wagons-Lits company, but essentially devoted the rest of his life to writing. During the war he had written a life of the Biblical King David, and in 1949 he published Sergeant Shakespeare, a book about Shakespeare's early life. The Cabinet Office tried in vain, on security grounds, to block publication of his only novel, Operation Heartbreak (1950), as it was based on the real Operation Mincemeat, a successful British deception operation of the Second World War to disguise the 1943 Allied invasion of Sicily. The book was republished by Persephone Books in 2004.

He was created Viscount Norwich of Aldwick in the County of Sussex, in 1952, in recognition of his political and literary career. The title was not popular with some of the local dignitaries. His wife refused to be called Lady Norwich, claiming that it sounded too much like "porridge" and promptly took out a newspaper advertisement declaring that she would retain her previous style of Lady Diana Cooper. Cooper's sixth and final book was his acclaimed memoirs, Old Men Forget, which appeared on 5 July 1953. The Duff Cooper Diaries: 1915–1951, edited by his son John Julius Norwich, appeared posthumously in 2005.

Death
Cooper was intemperate in his drinking (and eating) habits throughout his adult life. As a result, in later life he developed cirrhosis of the liver, and oesophageal varices. This resulted in him suffering a fatal gastro-intestinal haemorrhage on 31 December 1953 when he was on board the French liner Colombie. The ship's doctor was unable to arrest the bleeding and he died suddenly, from hypovolaemic shock, on 1 January 1954 aged 63. The ship docked at the Spanish port of Vigo so his body could be flown back to England, where he was buried in the mausoleum of the Manners family at Belvoir Castle in the Vale of Belvoir, Leicestershire. His estate was valued for probate at £14,303 7s.

Legacy
After Cooper's death, a British literary award, the Duff Cooper Prize, was established in his name. His biographer Philip Ziegler wrote that Cooper was "not totally successful in worldly terms but never dull", though he was "arrogant, self-indulgent and selfish, and devoted far too much time and energy to wine, women and gambling". However, he was "never mean or ignoble" and was "a proud patriot" who sometimes had "true nobility", although he was "too proud to court popularity" and too reserved to attract it readily.

On 28 November 2021, Cooper was posthumously awarded the Order of the White Lion, the highest decoration of Czechoslovakia and the Czech Republic, in recognition of his opposition to the Munich Agreement.

In popular culture
H. G. Wells, in The Shape of Things to Come which was published in 1934, predicted a Second World War in which Britain would not participate but would vainly try to effect a peaceful compromise. In this vision, Duff Cooper was mentioned as one of several prominent Britons delivering "brilliant pacific speeches" which "echo throughout Europe" but fail to end the war; the other would-be peacemakers, in Wells' vision, included Leslie Hore Belisha, Ellen Wilkinson and Randolph Churchill.

Family and ancestry
Cooper was married to Lady Diana from 1919 to his death and their only child was John Julius Norwich (1929–2018), who became well known as a writer and television presenter. Cooper's granddaughter Artemis has published several books, including A Durable Fire: The Letters of Duff and Diana Cooper, 1913–50.

One of Cooper's maternal great-great-grandfathers was King William IV. He fathered eight illegitimate children with Dorothea Jordan, including Lady Elizabeth FitzClarence. She married William Hay, 18th Earl of Erroll, and one of their children was Lady Agnes Hay, Cooper's grandmother. Lady Agnes married James Duff, 5th Earl Fife, and they had five children including Cooper's mother, Lady Agnes Duff. Cooper's sister Stephanie was the paternal great-grandmother of former Prime Minister David Cameron.

Genealogy

Arms

References

Footnotes

Bibliography

Further reading

External links

 
 
 
 

|-

1890 births
1954 deaths
Alumni of New College, Oxford
Ambassadors of the United Kingdom to France
British Army personnel of World War I
British Secretaries of State
British people of World War II
Chancellors of the Duchy of Lancaster
Norwich, Duff Cooper, 1st Viscount
Conservative Party (UK) MPs for English constituencies
Norwich, Duff Cooper, 1st Viscount
First Lords of the Admiralty
Grenadier Guards officers
Norwich, Duff Cooper, 1st Viscount
Norwich, Duff Cooper, 1st Viscount
Military personnel from London
Ministers in the Chamberlain peacetime government, 1937–1939
Ministers in the Churchill wartime government, 1940–1945
Viscounts created by Elizabeth II
People educated at Wixenford School
Politicians awarded knighthoods
Politics of the Metropolitan Borough of Oldham
Recipients of the Order of the White Lion
UK MPs 1924–1929
UK MPs 1929–1931
UK MPs 1931–1935
UK MPs 1935–1945
UK MPs who were granted peerages
People educated at Eton College